is a passenger railway station located in the city of Asaka, Saitama, Japan, operated by the private railway operator Tōbu Railway.

Lines
Located between Wakōshi and Asakadai stations, it is 14.0 km from the Ikebukuro terminus. Express, Semi express and Local services stop at this station.

Station layout
The station consists of two island platforms serving four tracks, with an elevated station building located above the platforms. Chest-high platform edge doors are scheduled to be added by the end of fiscal 2020.

Platforms

It is planned to have platform edge doors on the Up platform (tracks 3 and 4) in use from 23 March 2019.

History
It was renamed Asaka Station on 10 May 1932.

Through-running to and from  via the Tokyo Metro Fukutoshin Line commenced on 14 June 2008.

From 17 March 2012, station numbering was introduced on the Tōbu Tōjō Line, with Asaka Station becoming "TJ-12".

From March 2023, Asaka Station became an Express service stop following the abolishment of the Rapid (快速, Kaisoku) services and reorganization of the Tōbu Tōjō Line services.

Passenger statistics
In fiscal 2019, the station was used by an average of 69,779 passengers daily.

Surrounding area
Asaka City Hall
Asaka Post Office
 JGSDF Camp Asaka

Bus services

The station is served by "Wakuwaku" community bus services operated by the city of Asaka.

See also
 Asaka Station (Osaka), on the Hanwa Line in Sakai, Osaka
 List of railway stations in Japan

References

External links
 
  

Tobu Tojo Main Line
Stations of Tobu Railway
Railway stations in Saitama Prefecture
Railway stations in Japan opened in 1914
Asaka, Saitama